Hochstadt can refer to three battles:

Battle of Höchstädt (1703) 
Battle of Blenheim (1704) - frequently referred to in Europe as the Battle of Höchstädt.
Battle of Höchstädt (1800)

It also the name of different places in Germany:
Hochstadt, Rhineland-Palatinate, in the district Südliche Weinstraße
Hochstadt am Main, in Bavaria
a subdivision of Weßling, in Bavaria
 Maintal-Hochstadt, a district of the city of Maintal, Hesse

and places with similar names:
Hochstaden, a Medieval county in Rhineland, near Cologne.
Höchstädt an der Donau, in the district of Dillingen, Bavaria (site of the battles in 1703, 1704 and 1800)
Höchstädt im Fichtelgebirge, in the district of Wunsiedel, Bavaria
Höchstadt, in the Erlangen-Höchstadt district, Bavaria
Hochstatt, in Alsace, France